Aegires flores is a species of sea slug. It is a dorid nudibranch, a shell-less marine gastropod mollusc in the family Aegiridae.

Distribution 
This species was described from Enewetak Atoll, Marshall Islands. It has also been reported from Papua New Guinea, Sulawesi, the Philippine Islands, and from Japan.

References

Aegiridae
Gastropods described in 2004